Charaxes opinatus is a butterfly in the family Nymphalidae. It is found in western Uganda, Rwanda, Burundi and the Democratic Republic of the Congo (Kivu).

Description
Ch. opinatus Heron. male: almost exactly like that of etheocles in shape and size. Wings above black-brown ; forewing unicolorous without markings; hindwing with the tails and a continuous marginal line orange-red and before the distal margin with grey-blue, white-centred submarginal dots; about 6 mm. from the distal margin is placed between veins lb and 7 a transverse row of small, red-yellow, separated transverse streaks. The under surface strongly recalls that of anticlea, both wings having before the 
middle a darker, almost straight-edged transverse band about 5 mm. in breadth, which is curved round basewards in cellule lc of the hindwing and more or less completely covers cellules la—lc. female: unknown. Ruwenzori.

Biology
The habitat consists of montane forests.

The larvae feed on Caesalpinia species.

Taxonomy
Charaxes opinatus is a member of the large species group Charaxes etheocles.

Realm
Afrotropical realm

References

Victor Gurney Logan Van Someren, 1970 Revisional notes on African Charaxes (Lepidoptera: Nymphalidae). Part VI. Bulletin of the British Museum (Natural History) (Entomology) 197-250.

External links
Images of C. opinatus Royal Museum for Central Africa (Albertine Rift Project)
Charaxes opinatus images at Consortium for the Barcode of Life

Butterflies described in 1909
opinatus